People of the Year is one of the most prominent awards in India. Constituted by Coca-Cola India, to honor people who have consistently contributed to 'Indian excellence'. Prominent recipients of award include Anand Mahindra, Amitabh Bachchan, Naseeruddin Shah, Lata Mangeshkar, Mani Ratnam, Abhinav Bindra, Sachin Tendulkar,  Justice J.S. Verma, Akbar Khan, Kamal Haasan and Gulzar.

Selection 
A panel of judges selects people who have consistently contributed to Indian excellence.

List of recipients

2009

2010 
7 Indian personalities were chosen in year 2010.

2012 
Gulzar, Asha Bhosle, Yesudas.

2013

2016 
15 renowned PWDs were chosen by the Limca Book of Records as People of the Year.

2017 
20 celebrities from Indian cinema were chosen & awarded in year 2017.

See also 

 Limca Book of Records
 Coca-Cola India

References 

Award ceremonies in India
Indian awards